DITA Open Toolkit (DITA-OT) is an open-source publishing engine for content authored in the Darwin Information Typing Architecture (DITA).

The toolkit's extensible plug-in mechanism allows users to add their own transformations and customize the default output, which includes: 
 Eclipse Help
 HTML5
 Microsoft Compiled HTML Help
 Markdown
 PDF, through XSL-FO
 troff
 XHTML and XHTML with a JavaScript frameset

Originally developed by IBM and released to open source in 2005, the distribution packages contain Ant, Apache FOP, Java, Saxon, and Xerces.

Many DITA authoring tools and DITA CMSs integrate the DITA-OT, or parts of it, into their publishing workflows.

Standalone tools have also been developed to run the DITA-OT via a graphical user interface instead of the command line.

References

External links
 “DITA Open Toolkit documentation” From 1.5.2 to current version
 GitHub DITA-OT code repository
 DITA XML.org “Information resource for the DITA OASIS Standard”
 “Introduction to the Darwin Information Typing Architecture” Don Day, Michael Priestley, David Schell

Markup languages
Technical communication
XML
XML-based standards